"Make Believe It's Your First Time" is a song written by Bob Morrison and Johnny Wilson. Originally recorded by Bobby Vinton, the song was twice recorded by Karen Carpenter, both as a solo act and as a member of the Carpenters.

Bobby Vinton version
Vinton's version was released as a single in late 1979 (backed with "I Remember Loving You") and reached No. 78 on the Billboard Hot 100 and No. 17 on the Adult Contemporary chart. It is Vinton's last Billboard Hot 100 entry to date and the second of two Vinton songs to have crossed over onto the country music singles chart (the other being 1970's "My Elusive Dreams").

Karen Carpenter versions

Solo rendition
Between 1979 and 1980, Karen Carpenter went to New York to record a solo album with Phil Ramone as producer. "Make Believe It's Your First Time" was one of twenty songs recorded. This version was ultimately shelved until 1996, with the release of her eponymous album, Karen Carpenter.  Karen's solo version is far more subdued with only a piano, bass and drums as her accompaniment.

Voice of the Heart rendition
The Carpenters recorded this version of "Make Believe It's Your First Time" for their 1981 album Made in America. The song, like Karen's solo version, went unreleased in her lifetime and was not included on the album. After Karen's death in 1983, the song was placed on the Carpenters' next album, Voice of the Heart, and was released as a single. Richard Carpenter's arrangement uses far more instrumentation, adds a bridge written specifically for this version, key modulation during the last chorus, and the inclusion of background vocals.

Personnel
Karen Carpenter - lead vocals
Richard Carpenter - keyboards
Joe Osborn - bass guitar
Ron Tutt - drums
Tony Peluso - electric guitar
Tim May - acoustic guitar
Jay Dee Maness - pedal steel guitar
Sheridon Stokes - flute
Earle Dumler - oboe
The O.K. Chorale - backing vocals

Chart performance

Bobby Vinton version

Carpenters version

Other cover versions
"Make Believe It's Your First Time" was also recorded by Dave & Sugar on their 1980 album New York Wine & Tennessee Shine.

References

1979 songs
1979 singles
1983 singles
Bobby Vinton songs
The Carpenters songs
Karen Carpenter songs
Songs written by Bob Morrison (songwriter)
Songs written by Johnny Wilson (songwriter)